The Ponte degli Scalzi (or Ponte dei Scalsi, in Venetian; literally, "bridge of the barefoot [monks]"), is one of only four bridges in Venice to span the Grand Canal.

The bridge connects the sestieri of Santa Croce and Cannaregio. On the north side, Cannaregio, are the Chiesa degli Scalzi (Church of the Barefoot or Discalced Monks) and the Santa Lucia (Ferrovia) railway station. The south side is the sestiere of Santa Croce.

Designed by Eugenio Miozzi, it was completed in 1934, replacing an Austrian iron bridge. It is a stone arch bridge.

Ponte degli Scalzi is located close to the site of construction of the fourth bridge over the Grand Canal, popularly known as Ponte di Calatrava although it was formally inaugurated as the Ponte della Costituzione. Construction was delayed in part due to controversy over its modern style, but the basic span was finally in place on August 11, 2007, and the bridge was opened for public use on September 11, 2008. This bridge is closer to the bus station than the Scalzi bridge.

References

Bridges completed in 1934
Bridges in Venice
Tourist attractions in Venice
Pedestrian bridges in Italy
Stone bridges in Italy
Stone arch bridges
1934 establishments in Italy